Sergey Nikolayevich Galitsky (born Sergey Nikolayevich Arutyunyan) is a Russian billionaire businessman, the founder and co-owner of Magnit, Russia's largest retailer, and president of FC Krasnodar. In 2021 Forbes Russia estimated his fortune at $3,500 million.

Early life
Sergey Arutyunyan was born on 14 August 1969, in Lazarevskoye, a suburb of Sochi, southern Russia, his mother is Russian and his father is Russian-Armenian. He later adopted his wife's surname. In 1985-1987 served in the Soviet army.

Career
In 1989, being a second-year student, began working in one of the commercial banks of Krasnodar. In 1993, he graduated from the Economics faculty of Kuban State University. A year later, he founded the company, "Transasia", which traded wholesale cosmetics and perfumery. In 1995,he came out of this business and founded the company "Tander". In 1998, he built the first distribution center, and immediately after the 1998 Russian financial crisis, opened the first grocery store "Magnit" in Krasnodar. In 2000, he switched to retail, and created the largest network by number of stores in Russia. In 2006, the company conducted its IPO and was valued at $1.9 billion.

In 2008 he founded FC Krasnodar, and in 2013 he financed the construction of the stadium of the same name for this club.

In 2018, Galitsky sold a 29.1% stake in the Magnit retail chain to Russian bank VTB for 138 billion rubles.

In 2019, Galitsky got into the wine business. Grapes are grown near the village of Gostagaevskaya in Krasnodar Krai. The wine is sold under the brand name Galitsky & Galitsky.

Personal life
He is married to Viktoria Galitskaya, and they have one daughter, Polina Galitskaya.

In March 2022, Forbes reported that the megayacht Quantum Blue was owned by Galitsky. Registered in the Cayman Islands with a value of $213 million at 341 feet, on March 22, it was recorded off the coast of Oman.

References

External links

1967 births
Russian businesspeople in retailing
Russian billionaires
Living people
Russian people of Armenian descent
People from Krasnodar
Russian football chairmen and investors
FC Krasnodar
Armenian billionaires